This list of botanical gardens and arboretums in Indiana is intended to include all significant botanical gardens and arboretums in the U.S. state of Indiana.

See also
List of botanical gardens and arboretums in the United States

References

 
Arboreta in Indiana
botanical gardens and arboretums in Indiana